Spark Capital is a venture capital firm in the United States, responsible for early-stage funding startups  of consumer, commerce, FinTech, software, frontier, and media sectors. It has branches in San Francisco, Boston, and New York City.

History
Spark Capital was launched in 2005 by Paul Conway, Santo Politi, and Todd Dagres. They have raised six early-stage funds and three growth funds.

 The first fund, for US$265 million, was raised in 2005.
 The second fund, for $360 million, was raised in 2008.
 The third fund, for $360 million, was raised in 2010. 
 The fourth fund, for $450 million, was raised in 2013 and its closure was announced in late February. Partner Bijan Sabet told TechCrunch that this brought Spark Capital's money under management to $3 billion.
 The fifth fund, for $400 million, was raised in 2016.
 The sixth fund, for $450 million, was raised in 2020.

Spark Capital also raised three growth funds.
 The first Growth fund, for $375 million, was raised in 2014.
 The second Growth fund, for $600 million, was raised in 2016.
 The third Growth fund, for $900 million, was raised in 2020.

Team
Spark Capital was founded in 2005 by Bijan Sabet, Paul Conway, Santo Politi, and Todd Dagres. Other people who have joined the company since its inception include Kevin Thau, Jeremy Philips, Alex Finkelstein, Yasmin Razavi, and Nabeel Hyatt. The company consists of approximately 1150 employees.

Investment approach
According to a Forbes article, Spark Capital's success can be attributed to maintaining focus specifically on technology startups in the media, entertainment, and mobile sectors. Further, information-sharing within the company was organized so that all partners can work with a portfolio company, not just the partner assigned to that company.

Spark Capital has been known for co-investing with Union Square Ventures. In fact, many of Spark Capital's top picks, including Twitter, Tumblr, and Foursquare, were made via partner Bijan Sabet and were joint investments with Union Square Ventures, made by partner Fred Wilson. Other firms with which Spark frequently co-invests include SV Angel, Lerer Hippeau Ventures, and First Round Capital.

Sabet says that Spark Capital's portfolio companies do not use non-compete agreements, which he says have been a key factor in limiting startup growth in New York and Boston.

Companies

Twitter
Bijan Sabet, the partner at Spark Capital, invested in Twitter's second (Series B) round in June 2008, along with Jeff Bezos and additional investments from past investors such as Fred Wilson of Union Square Ventures, and Sabet also accepted a board seat at Twitter. According to Hatching Twitter, Sabet and Wilson played a crucial role in facilitating smooth leadership changes at Twitter in October 2008 and later October 2010—ousting Jack Dorsey to install Evan Williams in 2008 and ousting Williams to install Dick Costolo in 2010.

In November 2013, shortly after Twitter's IPO, Sabet wrote a blog post expressing his gratitude to Twitter, both as an investor and as a user of the service. A Forbes article about Spark Capital quoted Sabet as attributing Spark Capital's success to the partners themselves' use of the products of the companies they invested in (such as Twitter) enabling them to better understand the companies from the perspective of consumers.

Tumblr
Spark Capital was one of the early investors in Tumblr, where they co-invested with Union Square Ventures, paying the same amount for the same share, with Bijan Sabet as the assigned partner from Spark Capital. Following the sale of Tumblr to Yahoo! for $1.1 billion, Spark Capital and Union Square Ventures each took home $192 million from the deal.

Oculus
Spark capital invested in Oculus VR in both Series A and Series B funding rounds, which was subsequently sold to Facebook for an estimated $2 billion. The company's General Partner Santo Politi joined the board of directors.

Cruise
Spark Capital invested in Cruise in the Series A funding round, and the company's General Partner Nabeel Hyatt joined the board of directors.

Coinbase 
Spark Capital invested in Series D funding rounds of a cryptocurrency exchange platform Coinbase.

Discord 
Spark Capital invested in multiple funding rounds of a gamer chat tool Discord, with General Partner Nabeel Hyatt joining the board as an observer.

eToro 
Spark Capital invested in multiple funding rounds of a social trading and multi-asset brokerage company eToro, and led its $8.3 million funding round in January 2011 and $15 million round in March 2012. The company's General Partner Santo Politi joined the board of directors.

Pendo 
In December 2016, Spark Capital led a series B funding round for Pendo, a software company. This was in collaboration with Salesforce Ventures, Core Capital Partners, Battery Ventures, IDEA Fund Partners, and Contour Venture Partners. The company's General Partner Megan Quinn joined the board of directors.

Perch 
Spark Capital has invested in multiple rounds of technology-driven commerce company Perch.

Niantic
Spark Capital led a Series B funding round for Niantic, a software development company that developed augmented reality mobile games Pokémon Go and Ingress in November 2017. As part of the $200 million funding deal, Spark's partner Megan Quinn joined Niantic's board.

Snap 
Spark Capital invested in multiple funding rounds of a camera and social media startup Snap (owner of Snapchat).

Others 
 Affirm
 Carta
 Oculus
 Plaid
 Postmates
 Slack
 Twitter
 Wayfair

References

External links
 

Financial services companies established in 2005
Venture capital firms of the United States
Companies based in Boston
Companies based in San Francisco